Michael Raymond Kazlausky (born June 27, 1969) is an American college baseball coach, currently serving as head coach of the Air Force Falcons baseball team.  He was named to that position on an interim basis prior to the 2011 season, and was made permanent after the season.

Early life and education
After graduating from Grant Community High School in Fox Lake, Illinois, Kazlausky attended the United States Air Force Academy. On the Air Force Falcons baseball team, Kazlausky was a four-year infield starter at shortstop in 1988 and second baseman from 1989 to 1991 under head coach Paul Mainieri.  He was an All-Western Athletic Conference honoree in his junior and senior seasons (1990 and 1991), led the team in batting in 1989 and 1991, and ranks among the top Falcons in many offensive categories.  He graduated with eight career records.

Coaching and military career
After serving two years in the United States Air Force, Kazlausky returned to the Academy and served as an assistant coach from 1993 to 1995. Kazlausky then returned to active service at Charleston Air Force Base as a Boeing C-17 Globemaster III pilot.  He returned again to the Academy as an instructor in 2000, and served until 2004 as a volunteer assistant baseball coach.  After two and a half years deployed abroad, Kazlausky returned again to the Academy and served his third tour as an assistant coach from 2006 to 2008.

He returned again in 2011 to serve as interim head coach, and retired after 20 years of service to become full-time head coach of the Falcons in 2012.

Head coaching record

See also
List of current NCAA Division I baseball coaches

References

External links

1969 births
Living people
Air Force Falcons baseball coaches
Air Force Falcons baseball players
People from Fox Lake, Illinois
United States Air Force Academy faculty
Place of birth missing (living people)
Baseball players from Illinois
Baseball shortstops
Baseball second basemen
Military personnel from Illinois